Clayton Patterson (born October 9, 1948) is a Canadian-born artist, photographer, videographer and folk historian. Since moving to New York City in 1979, his work has focused almost exclusively on documenting the art, life and times of the Lower East Side in Manhattan.

Early life

Before moving to New York City in 1979,  Clayton Patterson studied art at Alberta College of Art, University of Calgary, University of Alberta (Edmonton) and the Nova Scotia College of Art and Design University. He taught printmaking at University of Alberta, etching at NSCAD, and high school art at Memorial Composite High School in Stony Plain, Alberta. He also worked for other artists as a freelance lithographer and print maker.

In 1972 he began living and collaborating with artist Elsa Rensaa; though never married, they have remained lifelong partners.  Elsa was born in Norway and raised in Edmonton, Canada. Seeking a more experimental and avant garde art scene, Patterson and Rensaa left Canada and took up residence in lower Manhattan. In 2015, Mitch Corber created a short documentary video called Ludlow Street with Clayton that features Clayton Patterson walking down the street, discussing its cultural demise due to gentrification.

NO!art movement
Since 1999, Patterson and Dietmar Kirves have led NO!art. The NO!Art movement was founded by the late Boris Lurie, Stanley Fisher and Sam Goodman at March gallery, in New York in 1960.

Art

Patterson has worked in a variety of mediums including etching, drawing, sculpture, lithography and photogravure. Though technically trained as an artist, Patterson's sculpture style is more akin to so-called outsider or folk art, often incorporating found objects, vibrantly painted and collaged in elaborate vitrines and decorated frames. His painting and drawing is heavily informed and influenced by tattoo and graffiti culture.  Some of his large scale murals have appeared throughout the Lower East Side. From 1980-1982, Patterson's work was shown in a number of downtown galleries. As Patterson grew disenchanted with the SoHo art world, he distanced himself from the traditional gallery scene and moved deeper into the underground scene of Lower East Side.

Clayton gallery

In 1983, Patterson and Rensaa bought a two-story former sewing factory and storefront at 161 Essex Street. The bottom floor paid the mortgage, and in 1986 he converted the small storefront into an art gallery and
Clayton Cap store. From 1986 to 2003, they showcased a variety of New York artists, writers, neighborhood personalities including Quentin Crisp, Dash Snow, Angel "LA2" Ortiz, Boris Lurie, tattoo artist Spider Webb, Genesis P-Orridge, Peter Missing, Mary Beach, Taylor Mead, Agathe Snow, Manwoman, Swoon, Herbert Huncke and Elsa Rensaa.

Clayton hats

In 1986, Patterson and Rensaa began designing and fabricating custom baseball hats which they sold in the storefront at 161 Essex which they branded as Clayton Hats. The idea to make custom hats came from Clayton instructing Ben Booksinger, a cap maker on Avenue A, to embroider around the cap - off the peak.  Clayton realized Ben could make a drawing on his old fashioned embroidery machine when he saw Ben make a copy of a Savage Skull Patch and duplicated it as an embroidered patch.  Clayton got Booksinger to embroider Clayton designs on the front and on the sides of the cap. Thus the birth of the Clayton cap- the first designer branded baseball cap. The Clayton cap was the first baseball cap to have the embroidery all around the cap, and had the first signature and label on the outside of the cap. An embroidered signature on a repeated design, and a hand signed label for the custom one-of-a-kind designed caps.

As Booksinger gradually retired from manufacturing, Patterson and Rensaa took up the business of embroidering their own designs on hand made hats with a 100-year-old Bonis embroidery machine. The hats, designed by Patterson and made by Rensaa, were immediately popular with artists and were picked up by Elle and GQ.  The GQ article by Richard Merkin, named Clayton Hats as one of the two best baseball hats made in America. Some of Clayton Hats' notable customers included artists Jim Dine and David Hockney, actor Matt Dillon, directors Gus Van Sant and Rob Reiner, the Pet Shop Boys, and Mick Jagger, for whom they designed a custom jacket back piece.

Tattoo
In 1986 Patterson and Ari Roussimoff created the Tattoo Society of New York with the assistance of Elsa Rensaa. Roussimoff left the Society in 1989, and its leadership was carried on by Patterson and Rensaa. In 1997, Wes Wood, L.E.S. City Councilwoman Kathryn Freed, and Patterson worked successfully to make tattooing once again legal in NYC. After tattooing was made legal in 1997, Steve Bonge, Wes Wood, Butch Garcia became the founders and owners of the NYC International Tattoo Convention, held in the historic Roseland Ballroom;  from the start, Patterson was hired as an organizer and manager. For the first 10 years of the convention, Rensaa, who had tattooed at 161 Essex since 1986 (retired), designed and printed the invitation cards and posters.

Photography

In 1972, Rensaa gave Patterson his first camera and in 1980 he began photographing life in the Lower East Side of New York City. In 1985, Patterson began photographing kids from the neighborhood in front of his front door.  Over the years, he has taken hundreds of photos, and displaying them on his "Hall of Fame" in his storefront window.  As more photographs appeared in the window, more kids demanded their photo be taken in front the graffiti covered door.  Says Patterson:

The photos were later collected in "Clayton Patterson's Front Door Book" (2009, O.H.W.O.W. Press, Miami).

Tompkins Square Park police riot

On August 6 and 7, 1988, police clashed with the young anarchist squatter population in Tompkins Square Park in the Lower East Side causing a massive riot. Patterson had initially gone out to video tape a performance at the Pyramid Club,  but noticed a lot of activity around the park as well as a sizable police presence.  The restless, anarchistic, politically active, squatter population was gathering in protest over the newly enforced 1am curfew.   When the riot broke out, Patterson began taping the incident in full detail.  His footage from the night's events (some 3+ hours) became instrumental in exposing police brutality in New York City that was often reported but never videotaped.  As a result, New York District Attorney Robert Morgenthau ordered Patterson to surrender his tapes and camera. Patterson refused the order and was sentenced to 90 days in jail. After a 10-day hunger strike, Patterson's lawyers William Kunstler, Lyn Stewart, and Ron Kuby negotiated a deal that would allow the city to get a copy of the tape while allowing Patterson the right to keep the original.

Clayton archive

Patterson's collection of photography, video, art, press clippings, and books comprise a vast archive of Lower East Side history. The collection includes approximately half a million print photos, hundreds of thousands of digital photos, thousands of hours of video tape in multiple formats and numerous artworks by Patterson and Rensaa as well as other New York artists.  The archive also consists of various ephemera from the streets of New York City including brand stamped glassine heroin bags, protest banners and fliers, graffiti stickers and art.

In addition to the hours of Tompkins Square Park footage, the video archive contains a large number of interviews, concerts, and street protests (including the ACT UP AIDS protest). Patterson's documentation of the NYC hardcore punk scene of the 1980s and early 1990s includes footage of Bad Brains, Murphy's Law, Sick of it All, Side by Side, Reagan Youth, Sheer Terror and G.G. Allin. His videos interviews with artists Richard Kern, Nick Zedd, Joe Coleman, Annie Sprinkle, H.R. Giger, Kembra Pfahler (of the Voluptuous Horror of Karen Black), Ira Cohen, Pyramid Club dancers Phoebe Legere, Dee Finley, folk historian and ethnomusicologist Harry Smith and numerous tattoo artists, colorful characters and NYC community leaders  comprise an extensive historical document of the city.

Captured

In 2008, Clayton Patterson's life and work were the subject of the documentary film Captured. The film was directed by Ben Solomon and Daniel Levin and produced by Jenner Furst.  Marc Levin was the executive producer. The New York noise-rock band A.R.E. Weapons contributed original music to the film.

Departure from New York
In a relatively history-rich report on Patterson, 65 years old as of April 2014, The New York Times Alan Feuer reported the imminent departure of the artist from New York city for the Austrian spa town, Bad Ischl, on the Traun River in the center of the Salzkammergut region of Upper Austria; Patterson is quoted as saying of NYC, that "[t]here’s nothing left for me… The energy is gone. My community is gone. I’m getting out… I didn’t really leave the Lower East Side. It left me."  In the same report, Alan Kaufman, a writer and a friend of Patterson, suggested his departure was akin to "Atget quitting Paris".

Publications
Inside Out: The Art World of the Squats.  Clayton Patterson, Alan W. Moore, Laura Zelasnic, editors. (1994, Printed Matter, New York.)
Wildstyle: History of a New Idea. Clayton Patterson and Jochen Auer, editors. (2003, Unique Publications, New York).
Captured: A Film/Video History of the Lower East Side. Clayton Patterson, Paul Bartlett, Urania Mylonas, editors. (2005, Seven Stories Press, New York) 
Resistance: A Radical Social and Political History of the Lower East Side.  Clayton Patterson, editor.  (2007, Seven Stories Press, New York). 
Clayton Patterson's Front Door Book.  Clayton Patterson with Angel "LA2" Ortiz, Marco Hellraiser & Triby L.E.S.  Monica Uszerowicz, editor. (2009, O.H.W.O.W. Press, Miami)
Jews: A People's History of the Lower East Side (Paperback) (2012, Clayton Books, LLC; 1ST edition).

See also
 Shelby Hughes, another artist who collected glassine heroin bags

References

External links
 
 
 No!art Movement, Clayton Patterson page
 The New York Times: The Lower East Side, Before it Boomed
 The New York Times: The Lower East Side, Up Close and Personal
 Capturedmovie.com
 Capturedles.com blog

1948 births
Canadian photographers
Canadian video artists
Living people
NSCAD University alumni